Phosphatidylethanolamine-binding protein 1 is a protein that in humans is encoded by the PEBP1 gene.

Interactions 

Phosphatidylethanolamine binding protein 1 has been shown to interact with:
 C-Raf,
 MAP2K1,  and
 MAPK1.

References

Further reading